Francisco Muniz IV (born December 5, 1985) is an American actor. He is best known for playing the title character in the Fox sitcom Malcolm in the Middle (2000–2006), which earned him an Emmy Award nomination and two Golden Globe Award nominations. He is also known for his film roles in the films Deuces Wild (2002), Big Fat Liar (2002), Agent Cody Banks (2003), and Racing Stripes (2005). At the height of his fame, he was considered one of the most popular child actors and "one of Hollywood's most bankable teens" in 2003.

In 2008, he put his acting career on hold to pursue an open-wheel racing career, and competed in the Atlantic Championship. He returned to racing in 2021 in stock cars, before joining Rette Jones Racing for a full season in the ARCA Menards Series in 2023.

From 2012 to 2014, he was the drummer of the indie rock band Kingsfoil.

Early life
Francisco Muniz IV was born in Wood-Ridge, New Jersey, on December 5, 1985, the son of nurse Denise and restaurateur Francisco Muniz III. Muniz's mother is half Irish and half Italian, while his father is Puerto Rican (of Spanish descent from Asturias). He has an elder sister named Cristina. When Muniz was four years old, his family moved to Knightdale, North Carolina, where he grew up. He was discovered at the age of eight at a talent show in Raleigh, North Carolina, playing Tiny Tim in a local production of A Christmas Carol. His parents divorced shortly after, and he subsequently moved with his mother to Burbank, California. Beginning in the sixth grade, he was home-schooled by his mother.

Career

Acting

Muniz appeared in commercials and made his film debut in the made-for-television movie To Dance with Olivia (1997), starring Lou Gossett Jr. In that same year, he appeared in the CBS Hallmark Hall of Fame presentation of What the Deaf Man Heard. A small role in the film Lost & Found (1999) led to his breakout role as the title character on Linwood Boomer's sitcom Malcolm in the Middle, which premiered on Fox on January 9, 2000. The show was successful and it was quickly met with accolades. The pilot episode was watched by 23 million people and the second episode, "Red Dress" (premiered on January 16, 2000), by 26 million. He was nominated for an Emmy Award in 2001, and received The Hollywood Reporter "Young Star Award" for his work in the series.

Throughout his television career, Muniz made guest appearances on the shows Lizzie McGuire; Sabrina, the Teenage Witch; and MADtv. His first starring role was as Willie Morris in the 2000 family drama film My Dog Skip, which was released at the same approximate time as the pilot for Malcolm in the Middle. That same year, he provided the character voice of Domino in the 2000 video game 102 Dalmatians: Puppies to the Rescue and was featured on the video game Stargate Worlds. The following year, he contributed a character voice to the animal cast of the film Dr. Dolittle 2. Muniz was also the voice of Chester McBadbat in the first two seasons of The Fairly OddParents until Jason Marsden took over. He had a hit with the 2002 release Big Fat Liar, in which he co-starred with teen actress Amanda Bynes as a pair of students seeking revenge on a sleazy movie producer (played by Paul Giamatti). Muniz was also part of the ensemble for the gang film Deuces Wild, released that same year. In 2003, he made a cameo appearance as Cher's underage boyfriend in Stuck on You. That same year, he appeared in the series premiere of Ashton Kutcher's MTV practical joke series Punk'd.

Muniz subsequently played the title role in the film Agent Cody Banks as well as its sequel, Agent Cody Banks 2: Destination London. The first film opened in March 2003, and grossed $47 million; the sequel, which opened a year later, grossed $28 million. He trained in martial arts for the films, and performed most of his own stunts. He also commented that it was the point in his career where he should "make the transition from child actor to an adult actor or a respectable actor." In 2004, he wrote the teleplay of the TV show Granted, on which he was also the executive producer.

Muniz provided the character voice of a zebra named Stripes, who wishes to become a racing equine, in the 2005 film Racing Stripes. That same year, he made a guest appearance as himself in "Mr. F", an episode of the Fox comedy Arrested Development. In April 2006, he began filming My Sexiest Year, an independent film in which Harvey Keitel played his father. He announced, during that same month, that he would be taking a break from acting, in order to pursue a career in race car driving, under a full-time two-year deal with Jensen Motorsport in the Formula BMW competition. In 2006, he was executive producer for the movie Choose Your Own Adventure: The Abominable Snowman.

Malcolm in the Middle finished its run on May 14, 2006. Ten days later, on May 24, Muniz appeared in the horror film Stay Alive. He expressed a desire to leave traditional Hollywood film roles behind, saying: "Growing up has never scared me until last year. I started thinking about getting older, being an adult, and it scared me. Hopefully things will work out in my career. If they don't, then it was never meant to be."

Despite his earlier stated intention to take a break from acting, in May 2006, he signed on to star in the R-rated teen-sex comedy Extreme Movie. The film was originally planned to be released in 2007 by Dimension Films, but was ultimately released straight to DVD in February 2009.

In 2007, he became an associate producer of the film Choose Connor. In late 2007, he made a guest appearance in an episode of the CBS crime drama Criminal Minds. In December 2007, he made a cameo appearance in the movie Walk Hard: The Dewey Cox Story, playing Buddy Holly. In 2008, he began work on a film with former Missy Elliott protégée Brianna Perry, but the project was never released.

Muniz made a foray into the superhero genre with the family action film Pizza Man, in 2011. In 2012, he made a cameo appearance as himself in the second season of the comedy Don't Trust the B---- in Apartment 23. In 2015, he made another cameo appearance in The Mysteries of Laura, in which one of the detectives (Merideth Bose) had a crush on the actor/ racecar driver (Frankie Muniz) who was competing in a drag race. The team was on an NYPD case and suspected evidence would present itself at the drag race.

On September 6, 2017, Muniz was announced as one of the celebrities who would compete on the 25th season of Dancing with the Stars. He was paired with professional dancer, Witney Carson. Muniz and Carson finished the season in third place.

On August 1, 2018, it was announced Muniz would be the co-host of Dancing with the Stars Juniors on ABC, co-hosting with Jordan Fisher who was Season 25's Mirrorball Trophy winner.

Racing

Muniz has had a long-running interest in car racing. On February 18, 2001, Muniz drove the pace car for the Daytona 500 and met Dale Earnhardt shortly before Earnhardt entered his vehicle for the race. Muniz, who was also attending the race to film for MTV's documentary series True Life, witnessed the subsequent crash on the final lap which killed Earnhardt.

Muniz's career in car racing traces back to 2004, when he ran the Toyota Pro/Celebrity Race in Long Beach as a celebrity participant, finishing 7th. The following year, he finished third, and was the best-finishing celebrity after capitalizing on Ingo Rademacher and Aaron Peirsol's contact on the final lap. While investigating the possibility of joining a racing team as an owner, he was granted a test in a car, and instead signed a two-year deal with Jensen Motorsport as a driver. Muniz entered fourteen races during the 2006 Formula BMW USA season, and failed to finish in a point-scoring position. He was selected as one of the thirty–six drivers to compete in the annual Formula BMW World Final at Valencia. Muniz finished 29th. In April, he again competed in the Toyota Pro/Celebrity, finishing 11th after starting 19th.

In 2007, Muniz moved up to the more competitive Champ Car Atlantic Series, where he competed in the entire season of 12 races. For the season, his best race finish was ninth place, and he officially earned a total of 41 points (for 22nd place) and $17,000 in prize money, logging 351 laps. In January 2007, he placed second at the Sebring Winter National race. He signed with Atlantic Championship-winning team Pacific Coast Motorsports in January 2008, with a goal to consistently compete in the top ten of the points championship. He finished the 2008 season in eleventh place. At the end of the 2008 season, he won the Jovy Marcelo Award, an award for sportsmanship voted on by fellow drivers named in memory of the 1991 Atlantic Championship winner who was killed during practice for the 1992 Indianapolis 500. In 2009, Muniz joined Team Stargate Worlds, and finished in the top ten in every race he contested, with a best finish of fourth at Miller Motorsports Park. However, prior to the penultimate race at Road America, his season was shortened by wrist surgery.

In 2011, Muniz returned to the Toyota Pro/Celebrity Race; after starting 15th, he finished 4th.

On October 23, 2021, Muniz made his stock car racing debut at Kern County Raceway Park in Bakersfield, California, competing in the SRL Pro Late Model series driving for High Point Racing.

In January 2022, Muniz participated in the ARCA Menards Series test at Daytona International Speedway, driving the No. 01 Ford for Fast Track Racing.

On January 11, 2023, it was announced that Muniz would drive full time for Rette Jones Racing in the ARCA Menards Series in the team's No. 30 Ford Mustang.

Music
Muniz joined the unsigned band You Hang Up as a drummer.

In 2012, he joined Kingsfoil, a band based in York, Pennsylvania, and endorsed SJC Drums and Imperial Cymbals. In 2014, he left the band because of scheduling problems.

In 2017, Muniz announced on Facebook that he is the manager for the York-based band Astro Lasso, which consists of Jordan Davis and Tristan Martin of his former band Kingsfoil. Muniz travels with the band doing their monitor systems, lights, as well as being the designated driver. The band opened for We the Kings, Cute Is What We Aim For, and Plaid Brixx on the 10th anniversary of We the Kings' self titled album tour during spring of 2017.

Business ventures
Muniz has been an active real estate investor throughout his adult life. In addition to purchasing multiple residential properties, Muniz purchased parking lots in Downtown Los Angeles, specifically around the Staples Center, in the early 2000s in an effort to generate passive income with low overhead. Muniz sold the parking lots in 2006. 

In 2018, Muniz and Paige Price bought Outrageous Olive Oils & Vinegars, a small specialty shop in Scottsdale, Arizona. He said that he and Price had fallen into "complementary step" with Price handling the inventory and social media while he tackles logistics. In an interview with The Cut, he explained his schedule: "My day this morning started at 6 a.m. getting up to go to Restaurant Depot to get products that we needed. Then I got here early to start filling bottles and to make sure all the shelves were stocked. We're not just ordering product and putting it on the shelf. We bottle everything. We label the bottles. We seal everything. We do all that ourselves here in store. It's a lot of work, but it's really rewarding when people come in and rave about the product." In August 2020, during the COVID-19 pandemic, the two sold the store; they said that Price's pregnancy was the reason for the sale, and that sales were steady despite the pandemic forcing the business into an online-only model. In May 2021, Muniz spoke about his love for carbon fiber wallets and announced a partnership with the Ridge Wallet.

Personal life
Muniz is a fan of the Arizona Cardinals and the Los Angeles Clippers.

Muniz is reportedly a supporter of English Football team Coventry City, this connection apparently coming from a friendship he made with a producer on the set of the film Agent Cody Banks 2.

In 2005, Muniz was engaged to Jamie Grady. In 2008, he met publicist Elycia Marie Turnbow through their mutual personal trainer at a Los Angeles gym. They began dating and later moved to Scottsdale, Arizona. They had a domestic dispute in February 2011, which involved the police and reportedly involved Muniz pointing a gun at his own head, though he later called this a "fake overblown story". They became engaged in October 2011, but later called it off.

Muniz began dating Paige Price in 2016, and he announced their engagement on November 18, 2018. They married on February 21, 2020. Their son, Mauz Mosley Muniz, was born on March 22, 2021.

Health issues 
On November 30, 2012, at age 26, Muniz was hospitalized after having a suspected transient ischemic attack, and spoke about the experience on Katie. He was diagnosed with a second attack a year later on November 25, 2013. When asked about his health in October 2017, he said that he has had no issues. However, that same month, it was claimed on Dancing with the Stars that he suffered significant amnesia, theorized to be caused (at least partially) by multiple concussions; the TV show gave the impression that he could not remember the majority of his time on Malcolm in the Middle, and that his former co-star Bryan Cranston often called him to remind him about the good times they had. In 2021, as a guest on the Steve-O's Wild Ride! podcast, Muniz revealed that the mini-strokes were a misdiagnosis and he was instead suffering from migraine auras. He also clarified that the story of his memory loss was largely misinterpreted by media sources. In the same podcast he also clarified that reports of his amnesia were false, that they were based on a throwaway sentence: "Man, I don't remember what happened in 2001". Individual gaps in his memory occurred due to a large number of concussions as a teenager.

Filmography

Film

Television

Video games

Music videos

Awards and nominations

Motorsports career results

American open-wheel racing results
(key)

Atlantic Championship

ARCA Menards Series 
(key) (Bold – Pole position awarded by qualifying time. Italics – Pole position earned by points standings or practice time. * – Most laps led. ** – All laps led.)

ARCA Menards Series East

ARCA Menards Series West

References

External links

 
 
 

1985 births
Living people
20th-century American male actors
21st-century American drummers
21st-century American male actors
21st-century American male musicians
21st-century American male writers
21st-century American screenwriters
Actors from Raleigh, North Carolina
Actors from the New York metropolitan area
American child musicians
American film producers
American indie pop musicians
American indie rock musicians
American male child actors
American male drummers
American male film actors
American male screenwriters
American male television actors
American male voice actors
American music managers
American musicians of Puerto Rican descent
American people of Irish descent
American people of Puerto Rican descent
American people of Spanish descent
American rock drummers
American sportsmen
American people of Italian descent
American sportspeople of Puerto Rican descent
Atlantic Championship drivers
Film producers from Arizona
Film producers from New Jersey
Formula BMW USA drivers
Hispanic and Latino American male actors
Hispanic and Latino American writers
Indie rock drummers
Male actors from Arizona
Male actors from New Jersey
Male actors from North Carolina
Male actors from Scottsdale, Arizona
Musicians from New Jersey
Musicians from North Carolina
Musicians from Scottsdale, Arizona
Musicians from the New York metropolitan area
People from Knightdale, North Carolina
People from Wood-Ridge, New Jersey
People with amnesia
People with traumatic brain injuries
Racing drivers from Arizona
Racing drivers from New Jersey
Racing drivers from North Carolina
Screenwriters from Arizona
Screenwriters from New Jersey
Screenwriters from North Carolina
Sportspeople from Bergen County, New Jersey
Sportspeople from Raleigh, North Carolina
Sportspeople from Scottsdale, Arizona
Sportspeople from the New York metropolitan area
Television producers from Arizona
Television producers from New Jersey
Writers from New Jersey
Writers from North Carolina
Writers from Scottsdale, Arizona
US RaceTronics drivers